Main Bazaar is an important shopping locality in Ooty, Tamil Nadu, India. It forms part of Ward number 30 of the Ooty constituency. The bazaar features both government-run shops and privately owned shopping outlets. All the produce from in and around Ooty are sold in this bazaar. The different produce sold are different varieties of Tea, groceries and cutlery items. The other items sold in the place include paintings by local painters and clothing reflecting the local culture.

See also
 Ooty Market
 Ooty bus stand
 St. Joseph's Higher Secondary School, Ooty

References

Culture of Ooty